Alwynulus is a genus of trilobites in the order Phacopida, which existed in what is now Scotland. It was described by Tripp in 1967, and the type species is Alwynulus peregrinus.

References

External links
 Alwynulus at the Paleobiology Database

Fossils of Great Britain
Phacopida genera
Encrinuridae